Sabor is the common name in Croatian for the Croatian Parliament.

Sabor, meaning "assembly" may also refer to:
 Diet of Dalmatia, a former legislative assembly in Dalmatia
 Diet of Bosnia, a former political body in Bosnia and Herzegovina
 The Holy Assembly of Bishops ( in Serbian), the highest organizational unit of the Serb Orthodox Church
 Saborna crkva, any Cathedral church in the Serb Orthodoxy

Other uses:
 Sabor (Tarzan), a fictional animal character from the Tarzan novels of Edgar Rice Burroughs
 Sabor River, a river in north-east Portugal (a tributary of the river Douro)
 Sabor line (Linha do Sabor), a narrow gauge railway in Portugal which closed in 1988

See also 
 Sbor (disambiguation)